"Irish Blood, English Heart" is a song by British singer Morrissey, released as the lead single to his seventh studio album You Are the Quarry. His first new song in seven years, it was released on 12 April 2004 in the United States and on 10 May 2004 in the United Kingdom. 

The song, described as "the most unambiguously political of his career to date", touches upon Morrissey's identity as the son of Irish immigrants living in England. Driven by the hype of Morrissey's comeback, it became his highest-charting single in the United Kingdom (alongside 2006's "You Have Killed Me"), reaching number three on the UK Singles Chart. It is also his highest-charting single in Sweden, peaking at number four, and it reached number seven in Canada and the top 20 in Ireland and Norway.

Background and composition 
"Irish Blood, English Heart" is one of the oldest-written songs on You Are the Quarry. Morrissey first revealed its existence in a 1999 interview with The Irish Times, introducing it as the likely title track to his next album. He first performed the song live in 2002, referring to the title as "the components that make up my tubby little body." 

The song discusses Morrissey's identity as the son of Irish immigrants growing up in Thatcher-era England, and explores the themes of contention between the two nations. It is one of Morrissey's more political songs, with him denouncing Oliver Cromwell, Toryism, the Conservative Party, the Labour Party, and the British royal family. "[The lyrics] touch upon the disgust I feel for the British political system," Morrissey said.

The song has drawn a particular following from Mexican Americans and Hispanic and Latino Americans in the United States, who resonate with its themes of "split identity."

Release
In the United Kingdom, the song was first played by Steve Lamacq on BBC Radio 1 on 29 March 2004. However, Radio 1 did not playlist the single. Only XFM, which playlisted it, provided much exposure for the single in the UK. Despite the lack of exposure on mainstream stations, "Irish Blood, English Heart" debuted at number three on the UK Singles Chart, making it Morrissey's joint highest-charting single with or without The Smiths, alongside "You Have Killed Me" when it was released in 2006.

Early predictions had the song reaching the number one spot, and after only debuting at number three, Morrissey criticised BBC Radio 1 for not playing the song enough despite being "the only British single in the top five."

The single's world premiere occurred on the KROQ-FM Kevin and Bean show on 22 March 2004. The song received consistent airplay throughout April and May on such alternative rock stations as WFNX (Boston), WWCD (Columbus), CIMX (Windsor), KMBY (Monterey / Salinas), XTRA (San Diego), and of course KROQ-FM (Los Angeles), as well as CFNY (Toronto). The single's airplay increased over the next few months and upon its release it reached number 36 on the Modern Rock Tracks chart, Morrissey's first single to chart there since "The More You Ignore Me, The Closer I Get" in 1994.

Live performances
The song was performed live by Morrissey on his 2002, 2004, 2006, 2007, 2008, 2009, 2011, and 2014 tours. From the 2004 tour it was recorded and put on the DVD, Who Put the M in Manchester?.

In December 2013, Morrissey played "Irish Blood, English Heart" as the last of his three-song set during the Nobel Peace Prize Concert in Oslo.

Track listings

UK 7-inch single and CD1
 "Irish Blood, English Heart"
 "It's Hard to Walk Tall When You're Small"

UK CD2
 "Irish Blood, English Heart"
 "Munich Air Disaster 1958"
 "The Never Played Symphonies"

UK 12-inch single, US 7-inch and CD single
 "Irish Blood, English Heart"
 "It's Hard to Walk Tall When You're Small"
 "Munich Air Disaster 1958"
 "The Never Played Symphonies"

Personnel
 Morrissey: vocals
 Alain Whyte: guitar
 Boz Boorer: guitar
 Gary Day: bass
 Dean Butterworth: drums
 Roger Manning: keyboard

Charts

Weekly charts

Year-end charts

Release history

Media usage
An edited version eventually became one of the songs on the EA Sports video game FIFA Football 2005s soundtrack. The game's version does not include the line "And spit upon the name Oliver Cromwell/And denounce this royal line that still salutes him. And will salute him, forever"; instead, after the verse "I've been dreaming of a time when/The English are sick to death of Labour and Tories", the song reverts to the line that begins "To be standing by the flag not feeling shameful/Racist or partial".

The song has also been released as downloadable content for the console versions of the main games in the Rock Band series.

See also
 Irish Briton

References

Morrissey songs
2004 singles
Songs written by Morrissey
Songs written by Alain Whyte
Irish patriotic songs
British patriotic songs
Political songs
2004 songs
UK Independent Singles Chart number-one singles